Assawoman is an unincorporated community in Accomack County, Virginia. Its ZIP code is 23302.

Etymology
The name "Assawoman" denoted a female Indian of the similarly-named tribe. Assawoman was originally known as Assawaman until 1966 when the Board on Geographic Names decided upon its current spelling.

History

Arbuckle Place, situated in Assawoman, was added to the National Register of Historic Places in 1986. Their post office was established in October 1890.

See also
 Assawoman Bay

References

Unincorporated communities in Accomack County, Virginia
Unincorporated communities in Virginia